Kylestrome  is a village on the north shore of Loch a' Chàirn Bhàin,  northwest of Unapool, in Sutherland, Scottish Highlands and is in the Scottish council area of Highland.

References

External links
 Kylestrome

Populated places in Sutherland